The Sex Magicians is the first novel by Robert Anton Wilson, released in 1973. It revolves around the goings-on at the Orgasm Research Foundation; its main protagonists are Josie Welch and Dr. Roger Prong.

The book has long been out-of-print, though it is now widely available on the internet as a .pdf file.

Discordianism
1973 American novels
Novels by Robert Anton Wilson
1973 debut novels